Saint Basil of Ostrog (/Sveti Vasilije Ostroški, 28 December 1610 – 29 April 1671), also known as Vasilije, was a Serbian Orthodox bishop of Zahumlje who is venerated as a saint in the Eastern Orthodox Church.

Life

Early life 
Stojan Jovanović was born on 28 December 1610, in the village of Mrkonjići at the bottom of the Popovo field in the Ljubinje nahija (Herzegovina), at the time part of the Ottoman Empire. His father was Petar Stojanović and his mother was Ana. Legends about him describe him as a diligent and obedient child, saying he inherited his graciousness and benevolence from his parents. 

Having raised cattle on the Herzegovinian hills and mountain slopes, he shared all of his food with poorer people. The Ottomans started to notice him, unenthusiastically monitoring this gifted young man. His parents, in order to avoid any danger, took him to the nearby Zavala Monastery, where his paternal uncle, the hieromonk Serafim served as the hegumen of the monastery. There he would study, and be protected.

Studies 
Having a rich library at his hands, the young Vasilije especially liked the cells dug into the rocks above the monastery church of the Presentation of the Blessed Virgin Mary. His character quickly made him a master of the Bible and basic Christian mysteries. After a while his uncle sent his protégé to the Monastery of the Most Holy Mother of God, the Tvrdoš Monastery in Trebinje, for further spiritual and theological studies.

Bishop of Zahumlje 
St. Basil's modesty made him reluctant to occupy high positions.  However, his piety, humility and dedication to the Church made him well suited for the role and he was elected as Bishop of Zahumlje and Skenderija, which he reluctantly accepted in 1639. He retired from the position ten years later in 1649.

Legacy 

After his death in 1671 he was buried at the Ostrog Monastery he had founded in Montenegro, and his tomb in a cave-church soon became a site of pilgrimage for Christians (both Orthodox and Roman Catholic) and Muslims drawn by reports of miracles occurring through the intercession of the saint. The Monastery of Ostrog is now one of the major pilgrimage sites in the Balkans, and large numbers of pilgrims gather particularly at Pentecost. St. Basil of Ostrog is commemorated in the Serbian orthodox liturgical calendar on April 29 (May 12 in the Gregorian Calendar).

The Orthodox seminary in East Sarajevo (Pravoslavni bogoslovski fakultet Sveti Vasilije Ostroški), part of the University of East Sarajevo, is named after him. A church in Nalježići, in the Grbalj region is named after him.

See also
 List of Serbian saints

References

Sources

External links 
 St Basil the Bishop of Ostrog in Montenegro, Serbia Orthodox icon and synaxarion

1610 births
1671 deaths
17th-century Serbian people
17th-century Eastern Orthodox bishops
Bishops of Zahumlje-Herzegovina
History of the Serbian Orthodox Church in Bosnia and Herzegovina
o
Serbs of Bosnia and Herzegovina
Serbian saints of the Eastern Orthodox Church
Serbs from the Ottoman Empire
Miracle workers